Grand Canyon Village is a census-designated place (CDP) located on the South Rim of the Grand Canyon, in Coconino County, Arizona,  United States. Its population was 2,004 at the 2010 Census. Located in Grand Canyon National Park, it is wholly focused on accommodating tourists visiting the canyon. Its origins trace back to the railroad completed from Williams, to the canyon's South Rim by the Santa Fe Railroad in 1901. Many of the structures in use today date from that period. The village contains numerous landmark buildings, and its historic core is a National Historic Landmark District, designated for its outstanding implementation of town design.

Geography and transportation

Groome Transportation provides scheduled service between Grand Canyon Village and Flagstaff, Arizona. Trans-Canyon Shuttle provides seasonal scheduled services between Grand Canyon Village and North Rim, Arizona and seasonal service between Grand Canyon Village and Marble Canyon. National Park Express provides a daily shuttle between Page and Grand Canyon Village.

The Grand Canyon Railway connects the Grand Canyon Depot in Grand Canyon Village with the Williams Depot in Williams, Arizona. Connections were offered to Amtrak's Williams Junction station until 2017, when the station was closed.

The National Park Service operates free shuttle buses on the South Rim.

Demographics

As of the census of 2000, there were 1,460 people, 651 households, and 345 families residing in the CDP. The racial makeup of the CDP was 73.7% White, 1.6% Black or African American, 18.8% Native American, 0.9% Asian, 0.3% Pacific Islander, 1.9% from other races, and 2.9% from two or more races. 10.2% of the population were Hispanic or Latino of any race.

There were 651 households, out of which 24.9% had children under the age of 18 living with them, 42.1% were married couples living together, 6.0% had a female householder with no husband present, and 46.9% were non-families. 31.6% of all households were made up of individuals, and 0.9% had someone living alone who was 65 years of age or older. The average household size was 2.18 and the average family size was 2.84.

In the CDP, the population was spread out, with 20.5% under the age of 18, 8.4% from 18 to 24, 41.2% from 25 to 44, 27.7% from 45 to 64, and 2.2% who were 65 years of age or older. The median age was 37 years. For every 100 females, there were 114.7 males. For every 100 females age 18 and over, there were 110.1 males.

The median income for a household in the CDP was $42,083, and the median income for a family was $53,676. Males had a median income of $28,750 versus $23,565 for females. The per capita income for the CDP was $19,923. About 1.7% of families and 4.8% of the population were below the poverty line, including 4.9% of those under age 18 and none of those age 65 or over.

Media
KUGO 102.5 FM is licensed to Grand Canyon Village, and broadcasts travelers' information for visitors to the Grand Canyon.

Education 
The area is served by the Grand Canyon Unified School District.

Historic structures and monuments

The following is a brief description the images of some of the historic structures and plaques in the Grand Canyon Village.
 Grand Canyon Railroad Depot – the depot was built in 1901 and is within the Grand Canyon Village Historic District. It is one of three remaining railroad depots in the United States built with logs as the primary material. It was listed in the National Register of Historic Places on September 6, 1974, reference #74000343. It was declared a National Historic Landmark on May 28, 1987.
 Horace M. Albright Training Center – established in 1963, and is located on Albright Street within the South Rim of the Grand Canyon. It is the primary training facility for new permanent NPS employees.
 El Tovar Hotel – built in 1903 and operated by the Fred Harvey Company. It is located in the Grand Canyon National Park, Rte 8A.  It was listed in the National Register of Historic Places on September 6, 1974, reference #74000334. It was declared a National Historic Landmark on May 28m 1987.
 El Tovar Stables – were built in 1904 and is located in the Grand Canyon National Park, Rte 8A.  It was listed in the National Register of Historic Places on September 6, 1974, reference #74000336.
 AT& SF Employee residences – built between 1924 and 1933. The residence pictured is located on Apache Street in the Grand Canyon National Park.
 Grand Canyon Power House – the power house was built in 1926 and located in the Grand Canyon National Park. It was Designated a National Landmark and listed in the National Register of Historic Places on May 28, 1987, reference #87001411.
 Bright Angel Lodge – built in 1935. It was designed by architect Mary Jane Colter and is located within the Grand Canyon Village Historic District.
 Buck O’Neil Cabin – built in 1890 by William “Buckey” O’Neil. Among the occupations which O’Neil had during his lifetime were that author, sheriff and judge in Arizona. He was a member of the Rough Riders and in Cuba he was killed in Action. The cabin is the oldest extant structure on the South Rim.
 Hopi House – built in 1904, by the Fred Harvey Company and designed by architect Mary Jane Colter. It is located within the Grand Canyon Village Historic District. It was Designated a National Landmark and listed in the National Register of Historic Places on May 28, 1987, reference #87001436.
 Look-Out Studio – designed by architect Mary Jane Colter it was built in 1914. It is located within the Grand Canyon Village Historic District. It was Designated a National Landmark and listed in the National Register of Historic Places on May 28, 1987, reference #87001436.
 Kolb Studio – historic structure situated on the edge of the South Rim of the Grand Canyon in Grand Canyon Village within Grand Canyon National Park in Arizona. It was operated from 1904 until 1976 as the photographic studio of brothers Ellsworth and Emery Kolb.
  Verkamp’s Curio Store – built in 1906, is now Verkamp’s Visitor Center and  operated by the Grand Canyon Conservancy for the National Park Service. Built by Ohioan John George Verkamp, who sold Native American crafts and souvenirs, the two-story shingled building has been described as “modified Mission” style, resembling an adobe building in form if not materials.

References

External links 
 Visitors Center
 South Rim
 

Census-designated places in Coconino County, Arizona
Grand Canyon
Grand Canyon, South Rim
Populated places established in 1901
National Park Service visitor services villages